Daniel Jackson (born 25 April 1986) is a former Australian rules footballer who played for the Richmond Football Club in the Australian Football League (AFL).

Originally from Carey Grammar, Jackson was drafted to Richmond from the Oakleigh Chargers in the TAC Cup with the 53rd selection in the 2003 AFL Draft. He went on to play 156 games for the Tigers, predominantly as a midfielder and lock-down player, and was a member of the clubs leadership group from 2009 to 2014.

In 2013 Jackson won the Jack Dyer Medal making him the oldest player to win the clubs Best and Fairest for the first time since Matthew Richardson in 2007. He also won the clubs Jack Titus medal for runner-up Best and Fairest in 2009.

Jackson was awarded the inaugural Jim Stynes Community and Leadership Award in 2012 for his work with a number of community programs. Jackson was also an active delegate and board member of the AFL Players Association throughout his career.

On 5 September 2014, Jackson announced his immediate retirement from AFL football, citing the toll injuries had taken on his body.

Continuing with his passion of helping people and community work, Dan has created Foundation Performance to maximise individual performance capabilities. He also travelled and volunteered in Nepal with THISWORLDEXISTS, an Australian non profit to hike to Everest Base Camp and support educational improvements in Nepalese communities.

Jackson achieved an ENTER score of 96.65, and has completed Commerce studies at the University of Melbourne.

Statistics

|- style="background-color: #EAEAEA"
|-
! scope="row" style="text-align:center" | 2004
|  || 23 || 6 || 0 || 0 || 31 || 21 || 62 || 9 || 21 || 0.0 || 0.0 || 5.2 || 3.5 || 10.3 || 1.5 || 3.5
|- 
! scope="row" style="text-align:center" | 2005
|  || 23 || 10 || 0 || 2 || 43 || 31 || 74 || 21 || 11 || 0.0 || 0.2 || 4.3 || 3.1 || 7.4 || 2.1 || 1.1
|-
! scope="row" style="text-align:center" | 2006
|  || 23 || 5 || 4 || 3 || 20 || 12 || 32 || 19 || 5 || 0.8 || 0.6 || 4.0 || 2.4 || 6.4 || 3.8 || 1.0
|- 
! scope="row" style="text-align:center" | 2007
|  || 23 || 15 || 7 || 6 || 129 || 81 || 210 || 79 || 22 || 0.5 || 0.4 || 8.6 || 5.4 || 14.0 || 5.3 || 4.4
|-
! scope="row" style="text-align:center" | 2008
|  || 23 || 11 || 4 || 2 || 105 || 88 || 193 || 49 || 38 || 0.4 || 0.2 || 9.6 || 8.0 || 17.6 || 4.5 || 3.5
|- 
! scope="row" style="text-align:center" | 2009
|  || 23 || 22 || 4 || 7 || 286 || 221 || 507 || 107 || 107 || 0.2 || 0.3 || 13.0 || 10.0 || 23.0 || 4.9 || 4.9
|-
! scope="row" style="text-align:center" | 2010
|  || 23 || 14 || 3 || 5 || 161 || 149 || 310 || 41 || 83 || 0.2 || 0.3 || 11.5 || 10.6 || 22.1 || 2.9 || 5.9
|- 
! scope="row" style="text-align:center" | 2011
|  || 23 || 21 || 7 || 20 || 236 || 171 || 407 || 58 || 105 || 0.3 || 1.0 || 11.2 || 8.1 || 19.2 || 2.8 || 5.0
|-
! scope="row" style="text-align:center" | 2012
|  || 23 || 19 || 10 || 13 || 197 || 158 || 355 || 74 || 66 || 0.5 || 0.7 || 10.4 || 8.3 || 18.7 || 3.9 || 3.5
|- 
! scope="row" style="text-align:center" | 2013
|  || 23 || 23 || 18 || 9 || 316 || 197 || 513 || 100 || 90 || 0.8 || 0.4 || 13.7 || 8.6 || 23.3 || 4.4 || 3.9
|-
! scope="row" style="text-align:center" | 2014
|  || 23 || 10 || 4 || 4 || 119 || 100 || 219 || 35 || 43 || 0.4 || 0.4 || 11.9 || 10.0 || 21.9 || 3.5 || 4.3
|- 
! colspan=3| Career
! 156
! 61
! 71
! 1643
! 1229
! 2872
! 592
! 591
! 0.4
! 0.5
! 10.5
! 7.9
! 18.4
! 3.8
! 3.8
|}

References

External links

 

Daniel Jackson (footballer)'s statistics from Footy Wire

Richmond Football Club players
Jack Dyer Medal winners
Living people
1986 births
Australian rules footballers from Victoria (Australia)
People educated at Carey Baptist Grammar School
Oakleigh Chargers players
Coburg Football Club players